Inauguration of Thomas Jefferson may refer to:

First inauguration of Thomas Jefferson, 1801
Second inauguration of Thomas Jefferson, 1805

See also